Qalatuyeh (also Romanized as Qalātūyeh, Qalātū’īyeh, and Qalātūīyeh; also known as Kalato and Kalātu) is a village in Abshur Rural District, Forg District, Darab County, Fars Province, Iran. At the 2006 census, its population was 1,568, in 309 families.

References 

Populated places in Darab County